State Road 687 (SR 687) is a north–south state road located solely within the borders of St. Petersburg, Florida. The road runs from Interstate 175 north to Interstate 375 along both 3rd Street and 4th Street. 3rd Street in a one-way route traveling northbound and 4th street is a one-way route traveling southbound. The intersections included on SR 687 on both 3rd Street and 4th Street extend between 5th Ave S and 5th Ave N in downtown St. Petersburg. North of I-375, the route runs partly concurrent with US 92 until the intersection with SR 693/SR 686/unsigned SR 600 intersection in northeast St. Petersburg and continues along 4th Street until terminating with northbound only Interstate 275 at Exit 32.

Route description

History

Major intersections

References

687
687
687